Muhayadin Mohamed (died February 15, 2016) was a Somali politician. He briefly served as Minister of Defence in 2008 during the Transitional Federal Government. Mohamed was an adviser to the Speaker of the Federal Parliament of Somalia, as of 2016.

Mohamed was killed in a car bombing, claimed by the terrorist group al Shabaab, in Mogadishu on February 15, 2016. A second person in Mohamed's car escaped the attack with minor injuries.

References

Year of birth missing
2016 deaths
Defence Ministers of Somalia
Government ministers of Somalia
Assassinated Somalian politicians
2016 murders in Somalia